Swimming Battle is a 2016 Taiwanese romance, sports television series created and produced by Sanlih E-Television. It stars Kingone Wang, Mandy Wei, Enson Chang and Cindy Yen. Filming began on June 1, 2016 and wrapped up in October 20, 2016.  First original broadcast began on July 8, 2016 on SET Metro airing every Friday night at 10:00-11:30 pm.

Synopsis 
Can a woman who can’t remember her past and a man who is trying to hide his true identity break a swim team’s losing streak? Yu Die (Mandy Wei) was a genius child prodigy who lost everything she loved. Yu Die’s mother drowned while trying to save Yu Die and, in one very bad day, Yu Die lost her mother, her memory and her ability to swim. Years later, she crosses paths with Gao Hai Fei (Kingone Wang), the CEO of a multibillion corporation. Intrigued by Yu Die’s lost memories, Hai Fei hides his true identity from her and gets mistaken for a professional part-time worker who is a jack-of-all-trades. Yu Die asks Hai Fei for his help with the “Flying Fish” Men’s Swim Team, which has never been able to win a meet and is the laughing stock of the sport of swimming. With Hai Fei searching for a “mermaid” crush from his past, will he agree to help Yu Die turn the losing swim team around?

Cast

Main cast
Kingone Wang as Gao Hai Fei （Phillip）
Liao Bai Xiang as childhood Hai Fei
Mandy Wei as He Yu Die
 as childhood Yu Die
 as Lin Ke Le
Qiu Chen En as childhood Ke Le
Cindy Yen as Fei Ou Na （Fiona）
Emerson Tsai as Chen Jia Luo (Ah Luo) 
Cai Rui Ze as childhood Ah Luo

Supporting cast
Peter Guan as Fang Yi Lei 
Aaron Lai as Wang Er Tai 
Roy Chang as You Yu An 
 as Ruan An Zhuo 
 as Du Xiao Mi
 as Luo Shan Shan 
Dewi Chien as Qiao Ke Qi 
Ban Tie Xiang as He Xing Xiong 
 as Pan Duo La 
 as Jin Chen Lang (Ah Lang)
Wayne Song as Cui Min Hao 
Collins Ying as Ying Shao Hua 
 as An Ge Ming (Ah Wei) 
 as Hei Mo Li

Cameos
Chang Fu-chien as school principal
Gao Wei Teng as director of student affairs
Tu Kai Xiang as section manager
Lu Wen Xue as Fang Jia Hao 
 as Sandy Wang
Lin Hai Er as Ke Le's mother
Wu Shi Wei as Mr. Cheng
Yang Li-yin as Auntie Hua Zhi 
Zhang Chang Mian as Qing Fang 
Chen Wan Hao as Uncle Black Carp
Zhuang Zhuang as Reporter Wang
Li Bo Ming as reporter
Tan Ai-chen as Gao Yan Ming Zhu 
 as Lei Long En 
 as Fei Tian Ci

Soundtrack
Handsome to Break Up 帥到分手 by Nick Chou
When You Are Gone 餘波盪漾 by Hebe Tien 
Every Day is a Miracle 人間煙火 by Hebe Tien 
A Dream Where You Dreamt of Me 我夢見你夢見我 by Yoga Lin 
Unshakeable Rascals 熱血無賴 by Yoga Lin 
Spoiled Innocence 天真有邪 by Yoga Lin 
Structure of the Heart 心的構造 by Nicola Tsang 
What Is The Shape Of Your Love 你的愛是甚麼形狀 by J.Arie

Broadcast

Episode ratings
Competing dramas on rival channels airing at the same time slot were:
FTV - My Teacher Is Xiao-he
SET Taiwan - La Grande Chaumiere Violette, My Sister
TTV - Life List, Q series

Awards and nominations

References

External links
Swimming Battle SETTV Website 
Swimming Battle EBC Website  
 

2016 Taiwanese television series debuts
2016 Taiwanese television series endings
Sanlih E-Television original programming
Eastern Television original programming
2010s high school television series